Yevgeny Semyonov (21 December 1920 – December 1988) was a Soviet water polo player. He competed in the men's tournament at the 1952 Summer Olympics.

References

External links
 

1920 births
1988 deaths
Soviet male water polo players
Olympic water polo players of the Soviet Union
Water polo players at the 1952 Summer Olympics
Place of birth missing